The 1998 United States Senate election in Illinois was held November 3, 1998. Incumbent Democratic U.S. Senator Carol Moseley Braun decided to run for re-election, despite the number of controversies that she had in her first term. Republican State Senator Peter Fitzgerald won his party's primary with a slim margin of victory. Fitzgerald won with a margin of victory of approximately 3%. He won all but five counties, and became the only Republican Senate candidate to defeat a Democratic incumbent in 1998.

Election information
The primaries and general elections coincided with those for House and as those for state offices.

Turnout
For the primary elections, turnout was 20.55%, with 1,386,694 votes cast. For the general election, turnout was 50.25%, with 3,394,521 votes cast.

Democratic primary

Candidates 
 Carol Moseley Braun, incumbent U.S. Senator

Results

Republican primary

Candidates 
 Loleta Didrickson, Illinois Comptroller
 Peter Fitzgerald, State Senator

Results

Reform primary

Candidates 
 Steve Denarie
 Don A. Torgersen

Results

General election

Campaign 
During Moseley Braun's first term as U.S. senator, she was plagued by several major controversies. Moseley Braun was the subject of a 1993 Federal Elections Commission investigation over $249,000 in unaccounted-for campaign funds. The agency found some small violations, but took no action against Moseley Braun, citing a lack of resources. Moseley Braun only admitted to bookkeeping errors. The Justice Department turned down two requests for investigations from the IRS.

In 1996, Moseley Braun made a private trip to Nigeria, where she met with dictator Sani Abacha. Despite U.S. sanctions against that country, due to Abacha's actions, the senator did not notify, nor register her trip with, the State Department. She subsequently defended Abacha's human rights records in Congress.

Peter Fitzgerald, a state senator, won the Republican primary, defeating Illinois Comptroller Loleta Didrickson with 51.8% of the vote, to Didrickson's 48.2%. Fitzgerald spent nearly $7 million in the Republican primary. He had a major financial advantage, as he was a multimillionaire. He ended up spending $12 million in his election victory.

In September, Moseley Braun created controversy again by using the word "nigger" to describe how she claims to be a victim of racism.

Most polls over the first few months showed Moseley-Braun trailing badly. However, after she was helped in the final month by notable Democrats such as first lady Hillary Clinton and U.S. Representative Luis Gutiérrez, three polls published in the last week showed her within the margin of error, and, in one poll, running even with Fitzgerald.

Results 
The incumbent Moseley Braun was narrowly defeated by Republican Peter Fitzgerald. Moseley Braun only won five of Illinois's 102 counties. Despite this, the race was kept close by Moseley Braun running up massive margins in Cook County, which is home the city of Chicago. However, it wasn't quite enough to win. Fitzgerald would only serve one term in the Senate. Fitzgerald initially intended to run for a second term.

However, after many Republicans and Democrats announced their intentions to run, Fitzgerald decided to retire. Fitzgerald served from January 3, 1999, to January 3, 2005. On January 3, 2005, Fitzgerald was succeeded by Democrat Barack Obama.

See also 
 1998 United States Senate elections

References 

1998
Illinois
United States Senate